Slab-O-Concrete Productions was a British mail order distributor and publisher, founded by Peter Pavement, Dave Hanna, Emma Copsey and Chris Tappenden; operating mostly in Brighton and Hove during the 1990s. Initially selling British small press comics and zines (including Pavement's own comics), Slab-O-Concrete also imported publications from the United States, Australia and Europe.

Slab-o-Concrete was originally based in Sheffield. It moved to Hove in 1995. After intensely increasing its publishing line in the late 1990s (including moving into CDs and prose books), it collapsed in 2001 as policy changes in the book industry caused cash-flow issues.

History 
In general, Slab-O-Concrete avoided distributing traditional comic books, instead making connections with underground publishers, zinesters, independent record labels,and other subcultural scenes.

By 1994, it had developed into a publisher, repackaging small press comics and zines for the bookshop market and originating new works. Notable creators published by Slab-O-Concrete included Jessica Abel, Ian Carney, Craig Conlan, Alan Moore, Woodrow Phoenix and Aleksandar Zograf.

In 1998, Slab-O-Concrete published four titles in partnership with Amnesty International. The comics were designed as 16-page minicomics with card stock covers, designed to be sealed and used as postcards. Ilya's A Bowl of Rice was about the forcible relocation and killing of Shan rice farmers in Burma. Enrique Rodríguez's Freedom from Discrimination was a story about maltreatment of and violence against street children in Brazil, and undocumented, unaccompanied immigrant children in the United States. Dan Jones' Just Deserts told the story of a female Filipino migrant worker's false conviction and punishment in Saudi Arabia. Peter Arkle's Love told the story of Mariana Cetiner, a Romanian woman arrested and imprisoned for allegedly attempting to seduce another woman. In 1999, Slab-O-Concrete published another 16-page mailable minicomic called Donna's Day, by Donna Mathes and Peter Bagge.

One of their its publications, in 1999, was The Worm: the Longest Comic Strip in the World, by Alan Moore and a "galaxy of greats", which was published in association with the Cartoon Art Trust and the Swedish Council for Cultural Affairs. "In one single working day, over 125 British cartoonists gathered together in one place to create 'the longest comic [wordless] strip in the world.'" The Worm had introductions and explanatory text in English, Swedish and French.

Titles published

Music 
 17%: Hendrix Was Not the Only Musician!, by Billy Childish & His Famous Headcoats (1998)
 The Attack of Everything, by Jad Fair and Jason Willett (2000)

Comics 
 Amnesty International minicomics
 A Bowl of Rice, by Ilya (1998) — published in partnership with Amnesty International
 Freedom from Discrimination, by Enrique Rodríguez (1998) — published in partnership with Amnesty International
 Just Deserts, by Dan Jones (1998) — published in partnership with Amnesty International
 Love, by Peter Arkle (1998) — published in partnership with Amnesty International
 Anarchy in the UK: the Comic (1994) 
 Artbabe in Pigskin vs Paintbrush!, by Jessica Abel (1999)
 Assume Nothing: Starring Liliane: Evolution of a Bi-Dyke, by Leanne Franson (1997)
 Axis Mundi, by Ian Carney and Garry Marshall (2000)
 Bad Hair Day, by Craig Conlan (1997)
 Bulletins from Serbia: E-mails and Cartoon Strips from Beyond the Front Line, by Aleksandar Zograf (1999)
 Cheap Date: Antidotal Anti-Fashion, by Peter Blake (2000)
 Daddy is So Far Away, We Must Find Him!, by Wostok and Grabowski (1998)
 Doc Trader, by Jessica Abel (2000)
 Dole Scum: Co-starring Bunny Girl and Pig Boy, by Nigel Auchterlounie (2000)
 Donna's Day, by Donna Mathes and Peter Bagge (1999)
 Dream Bytes, by Lee Kennedy (1994) — ongoing series
 Dream Watcher: Comics, by Aleksandar Zograf (1998)
 Eager Beaver (Missive Device), by Ian Carney and Woodrow Phoenix (1999)
 The End of the Century Club: Countdown, by Ed Hillyer (1999)
 Excreta: Stories of Bodily Fluids, by Ole Comoll Christensen (1999)
 Fishbowl #1 (1994), #2 (1995), by Chris Tappenden 
 Floozie, by Jane Graham (1998)
 Gash, by Soren Mosdal (2000)
 The GirlFrenzy Aillennial: a Big Girl's Annual, by Erica Smith (1998)
 The Great Challenge: an International Anthology of Political Cartoons (1998) — exhibition catalogue to accompany the Great Challenge held at Oxo Tower Wharf, London, 1998
 Hairy Mary: Fun Fur, by Craig Conlan (1999)
 Hairy Mary: Grrrl, by Craig Conlan (1999)
 Handy Hints for a Consumer Society, by Chris Tappenden (1995)
 Liberty Fernando: a Story of Zits & Revolution, by Ole Comoll Christensen (1999)
 Lux and Alby: Sign on & Save the Universe, by Martin Millar and Simon Fraser, with lettering by Ali Kirkpatrick (1999)
 Meet John Dark, by Darryl Cunningham and Simon Gane (1998)
 Pavement (issues #0, 1-3; title changed to Pavement Pizza for issue #4), edited by Peter Pavement, with contributions by Pavement, Dave Hanna, Lawrence Burton, Adeline Wartner, Paul John, Welly, Andy Hemingway, Renée French, and Chris Tappenden (1990–1994)
 The Plot Thickens (1997) — published with Brighton-based Armchair Comics
 Punk Strips, by Simon Gane (2000)
 Schwa, by Bill Barker (1995)
 Simon Cat in "Taxi", by Nigel Auchterlounie (1999)
 The Slab-O-Concrete Sampler, (1990) edited by Peter Pavement
 The Slab-O-Concrete Inactivity Book, edited by Woodrow Phoenix and Craig Conlan (2000)
 The Slab Selection, edited by Peter Pavement (1996)
 Spiral Dreams, by Al Davison (2000)
 Sugar Buzz: Live at Budokan!, by Woodrow Phoenix (1999)
 Teaching Through Trauma, by Leanne Franson (1999)
 Time Warp: The End of the Century Club, by Ed Hillyer (1999)
 Windy Wilberforce in The Saga of the Scroll, by Ed Pinsent (1995)
 Witch, by Lorna Miller (1999)
 The Worm: the Longest Comic Strip in the World, by Alan Moore and a "galaxy of greats" (1999)
 XXX (Strip) Burger, by Stripburger Magazine (1999)

Prose 
 Below Critical Radar: Fanzines and Alternative Comics from 1976 to the Present Day, edited by Roger Sabin & Teal Triggs (2000)
 Billy Childish: & His Famous Headcoats; Hendrix Was Not the Only Musician, by Billy Childish (1998)
 Cometbus, by Aaron Cometbus (1999) — zine
 Ground Level (1994) — zine about alternative comics
 Little Girl Blues, by Lee Kennedy (1994) – zine
 Spy TV: Just Who is the Digital TV Revolution Overthrowing?, by David Burke (2000)
 Towards 2012: the Journal of Millennial Mutation
 Part 2, Psychedelica (1996)
 Part 3, Culture and Language, by Gyrus T. Features, et al. (1997)

Notes

References 
 "Slår" to "Slatton," Reading Room Index to the Comic Art Collection. Michigan State University Libraries Special Collections Division
 
 

Book publishing companies of the United Kingdom
British comics
British small press comics
Comic book publishing companies of the United Kingdom
Book distributors
Small press publishing companies
Publishing companies established in 1994
Companies disestablished in 2001
1994 establishments in the United Kingdom
2001 disestablishments in the United Kingdom
Defunct companies of the United Kingdom